Alice Morgan Person (July 28, 1840 – June 12, 1913), known professionally as Mrs. Joe Person, was a North Carolina patent medicine entrepreneur and musician.  She manufactured and marketed a patent medicine of Native American origin from 1878 until her death.  Her third son, Rufus, continued to manufacture and distribute the medicine until 1943.

Alice supplemented her patent medicine activities by using her musical skills to demonstrate pianos for keyboard instrument vendors at county fairs and state expositions throughout the South.  As a result, visitors to the exhibits at which Alice played requested she publish her folk-tune arrangements, which she did in 1889.

Life and work

The second of five children, Alice was born and raised in Petersburg, Virginia.  Though financial woes plagued her parents, they still managed to provide Alice and her siblings with a high-quality education.  In 1857, Alice married Joseph Arrington Person, and by doing so became part of a prominent North Carolina family.  The couple settled on Joseph’s estate in Franklinton, North Carolina, just north of Raleigh, where they raised their nine children.

A neighbor introduced Alice to the medicine that would make her famous when her third daughter, Josephine, became seriously ill.  Alice credited the Native American elixir with saving her daughter, and continued to make and share it until she realized it could provide desperately-needed income.  Her husband’s stroke and the Civil War left the family with no way to make a living from their farm.  Alice christened the medicine Mrs. Joe Person’s Remedy and set out across the state of North Carolina selling it door-to-door and in drug stores, later supplementing this income with piano playing engagements and the sale of her published folk-tune arrangements.

Alice traveled widely, including multiple trips to the western United States.  She died in Santa Fe, New Mexico, during her third western excursion.

The medicine

The medicine was a bitters (i.e., a mixture of herbs and alcohol) that preserved and suspended the processed stems, leaves, or roots of seven native plants in a 20 percent alcohol base.  The medicine was especially effective for scrofula, a form of tuberculosis which inflames the glands of the neck causing painful sores.  Alice also developed an herbal wash to assist with healing these sores.

The music

Much of Alice’s performing repertoire had its roots in the music of blackface minstrelsy.  She published two collections of her piano arrangements of songs that harkened back to pre-Civil War days.  The first contained fifteen pieces and was titled A Collection of Popular Airs as Arranged and Played Only by Mrs. Joe Person at the Southern Expositions.  The second contained only three pieces and was titled A Transcription of the Beautiful Song Blue Alsatian Mountains! Also “Down-Town Girls” and “Boatman Dance” as Arranged and Played by Mrs. Joe Person.

Alice’s unique combination of medicine and music not only saved her family from financial ruin, it contributed to the healing of the South after the Civil War.

References

Further reading

Goertzen, Chris. “Mrs. Joe Person’s Popular Airs: Early Blackface Minstrel Tunes in Oral Tradition.” Ethnomusicology 35, no. 1 (Winter 1991): 31-53.
Hursh, David & Goertzen, Chris. Good Medicine and Good Music: A Biography of Mrs. Joe Person. Jefferson, NC: McFarland, 2009.
Pearce, T.H. “The Persistence of Mrs. Joe Person.” The State 54, no. 5 (October 1986): 22-24.
Person, Alice Morgan, Collection (#1116). Special Collections Department, J.Y. Joyner Library, East Carolina University, Greenville, NC, USA.
Person, Alice Morgan, Papers (#3987). Southern Historical Collection.  Manuscripts Department, Wilson Library, University of North Carolina at Chapel Hill.
Person Family Papers. Rare Book, Manuscript, and Special Collections Library, Duke University, Durham, NC.

External links
Alice Person: Good Medicine and Good Music Digital Collection, Joyner Library, East Carolina University
Collection Guide, Alice Morgan Person Collection #1116, Special Collections, Joyner Library, East Carolina University
Finding Aid, Alice Morgan Person Papers #3987, The Southern Historical Collection, Wilson Special Collections Library, UNC-Chapel Hill

1840 births
1913 deaths
Patent medicine businesspeople
Musicians from North Carolina